Emilio Recoba Cambón (born 3 November 1904 in Montevideo — 12 September 1992) was a Uruguayan footballer. He was part of the team that won the first World Cup in 1930 for Uruguay, but did not play any matches in the tournament.

He was a club player of Nacional. When Emilio Recoba died on 12 September 1992 he was the last surviving member of Uruguay's 1930 World Cup-winning squad. At 2010, Recoba was also the longest-lived player, having died aged 88, before he was overtaken by French midfielder Célestin Delmer, who died aged 89 in 1996, and Delmer's countryman, forward Lucien Laurent, who died aged 97 in February 2005 and Peruvian goalkeeper Juan Valdivieso, who died at the age of 96 in January 2007 (In 2010, Francisco Varallo died aged 100 years old).

References

World Cup Champions Squads 1930 - 2002
O nascimento da mítica Celeste Olímpica 

1904 births
1992 deaths
Uruguayan footballers
Uruguay international footballers
1930 FIFA World Cup players
FIFA World Cup-winning players
Club Nacional de Football players
Copa América-winning players
Association football defenders